Peter Ouko  is the founder and executive director of the leading anti-crime advocacy not-for profit in Kenya, the Youth Safety Awareness Initiative, better known by its brand name, CRIME SI POA. Wrongfully convicted and sentenced to death row, Pete became the first inmate in Kenya to study law behind bars   He founded Crime Si Poa ( “crime is not cool”), in Kenya's Kamiti Maximum-Security Prison. He earned his law diploma through a distance learning program, from the University of London International Program where he is completing his studies. Pete was released after 18 years behind bars in October 2016 on Presidential pardon and continues to pursue justice . An international and TED speaker, he speaks on governance, corporate resilience, criminal justice, penal reforms and social enterprise.

References 

Living people
Year of birth missing (living people)
Kenyan prisoners sentenced to death
Kenyan prisoners and detainees
Kenyan activists